Lance Robert Scott (born February 15, 1972) is a former professional American football player who played offensive lineman for two seasons for the New York Giants.

External links
 New England Patriots bio

1972 births
Living people
Players of American football from Salt Lake City
American football offensive tackles
American football centers
Utah Utes football players
Arizona Cardinals players
New York Giants players
New England Patriots players